Dick Harmon (July 29, 1947 – February 10, 2006) was a golf instructor with clients including Fred Couples, Jay Haas, Craig Stadler, Lanny Wadkins, Steve Elkington and 2009 U.S. Open winner Lucas Glover. He was a native of New Rochelle, New York and Palm Springs, California.

His father Claude Harmon won the 1948 Masters Tournament. His brothers Butch, Craig and Bill were also ranked in Golf Digest's Top 50 Teachers.

Harmon was the professional at the River Oaks Country Club between 1977 and 2001. After leaving that position, he established two teaching centres in Houston, Texas.

Harmon established the Dick Harmon School of Golf at the Houstonian with teaching assistant and friend Arthur J. Scarbrough.

Harmon died at the age of 58 from complications due to pneumonia on February 10, 2006.

References

"Dick Harmon, part of golf's top teaching family, dies" Sports Illustrated February 10 2006 retrieved February 11, 2006
Redstone Golf Club biography of Harmon
BBC Q&A with Harmon

American male golfers
American golf instructors
Golfers from Texas
Sportspeople from New Rochelle, New York
1947 births
2006 deaths